Ar rawdah may refer to:

 Ar Rawdah, Sanaa, Yemen
Ar rawdah, Abyan, Yemen